Brocks Gap is a water gap in Rockingham County, Virginia, where the North Fork of the Shenandoah River flows through Little North Mountain. The gap was the proposed site of the never-built Brocks Gap Dam and is traversed by Virginia Route 259.

References

Landforms of Rockingham County, Virginia
Water gaps of Virginia